Erik Ode (born Fritz Erik Signy Odemar, 6 November 1910 – 19 July 1983) was a German director and actor who was most famous for playing Kommissar Herbert Keller in the German television drama Der Kommissar (The Police Inspector). He married actress Hilde Volk in 1942. Many years later they co-starred together in the TV series Sun, Wine and Hard Nuts.

Selected filmography

Actor

 I.N.R.I. (1923) - Jesus als Kind
 The Cabinet of Doctor Larifari (1930) - Wolfgang Anglert, Chefredakteur
 A Student's Song of Heidelberg (1930)
 Sein Scheidungsgrund (1931) - Rudi
 Der Hochtourist (1931)
 Kadetten (1931) - Kadett von Brenken
 He Is Charming (1932) - (uncredited)
 Kavaliere vom Kurfürstendamm (1932) - Niske
 Ja, treu ist die Soldatenliebe (1932) - Krause
 FP 1 antwortet nicht (1932) - Konrad Lennartz
 What Women Dream (1933)
 Season in Cairo (1933) - 3. Gigolo
 Glück im Schloß (1933) - Georg
 The Castle in the South (1933) - Tonio
 Gypsy Blood (1934) - Graf Poldi Stauffenstein
 Charley's Aunt (1934) - Charley Wykeham
 The Daring Swimmer (1934)
 The Sporck Battalion (1934)
 Jungfrau gegen Mönch (1934) - Dr. Peter Rivius
 Winter Night's Dream (1935)
 Forget Me Not (1935) - Peter Petermann, Dritter Offizier
 Held einer Nacht (1935) - Jantschi, Reklamezeichner
 The Call of the Jungle (1936) - Kelly
 Victoria in Dover (1936) - Prinz von Oranien
 The Empress's Favourite (1936) - Fähnrich Alexander Platow
 Hot Blood (1936) - Husarenoffizier
 Der Abenteurer von Paris (1936) - Robert - sein Sohn
 Drei tolle Tage (1936) - Robert Ferry - Schauspieler
 Land of Love (1937) - Erster Beamter
 Unter Ausschluß der Öffentlichkeit (1937) - Wölfchen Hillberg
 Rätsel um Beate (1938) - Schauspieler, 1.Etage
 Grossalarm (1938) - Zeitungsfahrer Alex
 Stärker als die Liebe (1938)
 Das Leben kann so schön sein (1938) - Dewitt, Reisender
 A Hopeless Case (1939) - Student
 Ich verweigere die Aussage (1939)
 Alarm at Station III (1939) - Egge, Zollpolizist
 We Danced Around the World (1939) - 1. Freund
 The Little Residence (1942) - Primaner Erich
 Tonelli (1943) - Der Sekretär des Theateragenten Bauer
  (1944) - Gefreiter Otto Appelt
 Meine Herren Söhne (1945) - Apotheker
 Wir sehn uns wieder (1945) - Fritz Launer - Gefreiter
 The Berliner (1948) - Narrator (voice)
 Skandal in der Botschaft (1950)
 Czardas der Herzen (1951) - Gabor Takacs
 Just Once a Great Lady (1957) - Mann (uncredited)
 Liebe, Jazz und Übermut (1957) - Teddy Fisher, Künstleragent
 We Cellar Children (1960) - Aufgebrachter Vater
 Der Kommissar (1969–1976, TV Series) - Kommissar Keller
 Alexander Zwo (1972, TV Series)

Director
 Scandal at the Embassy (1950)
 The Land of Smiles (1952)
 Hit Parade (1953)
 Such a Charade (1953)
 Ten on Every Finger (1954)
 The First Kiss (1954)
 Music in the Blood (1955)
 Request Concert (1955)
 Heroism after Hours (1955)
 The Model Husband (1956)
 Just Once a Great Lady (1957)
  (1958)
 What a Woman Dreams of in Springtime (1959)

External links

Der Kommissar Unofficial Website 
Der Kommissar Unofficial Website 
Photographs of Erik Ode

1910 births
1983 deaths
Male actors from Berlin
German television directors
German male television actors
German male silent film actors
German male film actors
Film directors from Berlin
20th-century German male actors